Rhamnusium is a genus of beetles belonging to the family Cerambycidae.

The species of this genus are found in Europe.

Species:
 Rhamnusium algericum Pic, 1896 
 Rhamnusium bicolor (Schrank, 1781)

References

Cerambycidae
Cerambycidae genera